The Roman Catholic Diocese of Rafaela is in Argentina and is a suffragan diocese of Santa Fe de la Vera Cruz.

History
On 10 April 1961 Saint John XXIII founded the Diocese of Rafaela from territory taken from the Diocese of Reconquista and Archdiocese of Santa Fe.

Bishops

Ordinaries
Vicente Faustino Zazpe (1961–1968) Appointed, Coadjutor Archbishop of Santa Fe
Antonio Alfredo Brasca (1968–1976) 
Alcides Jorge Pedro Casaretto (1976–1983) Appointed, Coadjutor Bishop of San Isidro
Héctor Gabino Romero (1984–1999) 
Carlos María Franzini (2000–2012) Appointed, Archbishop of Mendoza
Luis Alberto Fernández Alara (2013–2022)
Pedro Javier Torres Aliaga (2022–present)

Other priests of this diocese who became bishops
Hugo Norberto Santiago, appointed Bishop of Santo Tomé in 2006
Gustavo Gabriel Zurbriggen, appointed Coadjutor Prelate of Deán Funes in 2011
Gustavo Alejandro Montini, appointed Auxiliary Bishop of San Roque de Presidencia Roque Sáenz Peña in 2014

References

Rafaela
Rafaela
Rafaela
Rafaela
1961 establishments in Argentina